Below are the squads for the 23rd Arabian Gulf Cup in Kuwait in 2017.

Group A

Kuwait
Coach:  Boris Bunjak

Saudi Arabia
Coach:  Krunoslav Jurčić
  

Note:
INJ Player withdrew from the squad due to an injury

Oman
Coach:  Pim Verbeek

United Arab Emirates
Coach:  Alberto Zaccheroni

Group B

Qatar
Coach:  Félix Sánchez

Iraq
Coach:  Basim Qasim

Yemen
Coach:  Abraham Mebratu

Bahrain
Coach:  Miroslav Soukup

References

External links
 Official site

squads